Gary L. Jerke (February 21, 1948 – June 28, 2022) was an American politician. He has served as a Republican member for the 19th district in the South Dakota House of Representatives from 2005 to 2008.

References

1948 births
2022 deaths
Republican Party members of the South Dakota House of Representatives
People from Hutchinson County, South Dakota